Orange Mountains can refer to:
 Jayawijaya Mountains - mountain range in Indonesia
 Watchung Mountains - mountain range in New Jersey